R. cinnabarina may refer to:

 Ramboldia cinnabarina, a lichenized fungus
 Rhodymenia cinnabarina, a red algae
 Russula cinnabarina, a mycorrhizal fungus